Eupithecia inexpiata is a moth in the  family Geometridae. The original description states the species is from New Zealand, this is in error, and the specimen is probably from Chile. The habitat consists of the Central Valley Biotic Province.

References

Moths described in 1863
inexpiata
Moths of South America
Endemic fauna of Chile